Rahavi Minimbou Kifouéti (born 12 March 1989) is a retired professional footballer who played as a striker or winger. Born in France, he represented Congo at international level.

Club career

Early career
Kifouéti was born in Issy-les-Moulineaux, Hauts-de-Seine (suburban Paris). He began his career in 2005 with AJ Auxerre. After six months without a club, following his release from Auxerre in July 2008, he signed a contract with ES Wasquehal on 12 December 2008. Afterwards, he had short spells with Le Havre, Vendeé Poiré-sur-Vie, USJA Carquefou and Luçon.

Botev Plovdiv
After a successful trial, Kifouéti signed a contract with Botev Plovdiv on 11 September 2015. During the trial, he scored twice in a friendly game against Lokomotiv Gorna Oryahovitsa.

Kifouéti made an official debut for Botev Plovdiv on 12 September, but he was unable to prevent the 0–2 home loss from Litex Lovech.

On 23 September 2015, Kifouéti scored his first goal for Botev Plovdiv during the 0–4 away win over FC Septemvri Simitli in a game for the Bulgarian Cup. In October, Kifouéti provided the assists for the winning goals against PFC Montana and Pirin Blagoevgrad.

In the spring of 2016, Kifouéti failed to impress. After taking part in 22 official games and scoring one goal, he was released from the club at the end of the season.

Lokomotiv GO
Kifouéti spent the next season at newly promoted Lokomotiv Gorna Oryahovitsa, but left the club in June 2017 when his contract expired.

Doxa Katokopias
On 11 July 2017, Kifouéti signed with Cypriot club Doxa Katokopias.

Elazigspor
On 14 August 2018, he signed for Turkish club Elazigspor.

Bastia
On 12 October 2018, he signed a one-year contract with SC Bastia, and was released in July.

International career
Kifouéti made his debut for the Congo national football team in a 5–1 2018 FIFA World Cup qualification loss with Ghana on 5 September 2017.

References

External links
 Player Profile at foot-national.com

1989 births
Living people
People from Issy-les-Moulineaux
Footballers from Hauts-de-Seine
Republic of the Congo footballers
Republic of the Congo international footballers
French footballers
French sportspeople of Republic of the Congo descent
Association football wingers
Association football forwards
AJ Auxerre players
Le Havre AC players
Vendée Poiré-sur-Vie Football players
USJA Carquefou players
Luçon FC players
Botev Plovdiv players
FC Lokomotiv Gorna Oryahovitsa players
Doxa Katokopias FC players
SC Bastia players
Ligue 1 players
Ligue 2 players
First Professional Football League (Bulgaria) players
Cypriot First Division players
French expatriate footballers
French expatriate sportspeople in Bulgaria
French expatriate sportspeople in Cyprus
Expatriate footballers in Bulgaria
Expatriate footballers in Cyprus
Expatriate footballers in France
2015 Africa Cup of Nations players
Republic of the Congo expatriate footballers
Wasquehal Football players
Black French sportspeople